Verkhneye Shilovo is a rural locality (a village) in Permogorskoye Rural Settlement, Krasnoborsky District, Arkhangelsk Oblast, Russia. The population was 219 as of 2010. There are 6 streets.

Geography 
Verkhneye Shilovo is located 27 km northwest of Krasnoborsk (the district's administrative centre) by road. Lisitsinskaya is the nearest rural locality.

References 

Rural localities in Krasnoborsky District